The Ilha Maracá gecko (Coleodactylus septentrionalis) is a species of lizard in the family Sphaerodactylidae. The species is endemic to northern South America.

Geographic range
C. septentrionalis is found in Brazil (Roraima state), Guyana, Suriname (Nickerie District), and Venezuela (Delta Amacuro and Monagas states).

Reproduction
C. septentrionalis is oviparous.

References

Further reading
Vanzolini P (1980). "Coleodactylus septentrionalis sp. n., with notes on the distribution of the genus (Sauria, Gekkonidae)". Papéis Avulsos de Zoologia, Museu de Zoologia da Universidade de São Paulo 34 (1): 1–9. (Coleodactylus septentrionalis, new species).

Coleodactylus
Reptiles described in 1980